A transition metal fullerene complex is a coordination complex wherein fullerene serves as a ligand. Fullerenes are typically spheroidal carbon compounds, the most prevalent being buckminsterfullerene, C60. 

One year after it was prepared in milligram quantities in 1990, C60 was shown to function as a ligand in the complex [Ph3P]2Pt(η2-C60).

Since this report, a variety of transition metals and binding modes were demonstrated. Most transition metal fullerene complex are derived from C60, although other fullerenes also coordinate to metals as seen with C70Rh(H)(CO)(PPh3)2.

Binding modes
As ligands, fullerenes behave similarly to electron-deficient alkenes such as tetracyanoethylene. Thus, their complexes are a subset of metal-alkene complexes. They almost always coordinate in a dihapto fashion and prefer electron-rich metal centers. This binding occurs on the junction of two 6-membered rings. Hexahapto and pentahapto bonding is rarely observed. 

In Ru3(CO)9(C60), the fullerene binds to the triangular face of the cluster.

Examples
C60 forms stable complexes of the type M(C60)(diphosphine)(CO)3 for M = Mo, W. A dirhenium complexes is known with the formula Re2(PMe3)4H8(η2:η2C60) where two of the hydrogen act as bridging ligands.

Many fullerene complexes are derived from platinum metals.  An unusual cationic complex features three 16e Ru centers: 
3 Cp*Ru(MeCN)3+  +   C60   →   {[(Cp*Ru(MeCN)2]3C60}3+  +  3 MeCN
Vaska's complex forms a 1:1 adduct, and the analogous IrCl(CO)(PEt3)2 binds 200x more strongly.  Complexes with more than one fullerene ligand are illustrated by Ir4(CO)3(μ4-CH)(PMe3)2(μ-PMe)2(CNCH2Ph)(μ-η2:η2C60)(μ4-η1:η1:η2:η2C60).  In this Ir4 cluster two fullerene ligands with multiple types of mixed binding. Platinum, palladium, and nickel form complexes of the type C60ML2 where L is a monodentate or bidentate phosphorus ligand.  They are prepared by displacement of weakly coordinating ligands such as ethylene:
[Ph3P]2Pt(C2H4)  +  C60  →  [Ph3P]2Pt(η2-C60)  +  C2H4
In [(Et3P)2Pt]6(η2-C60), six Pt centers are bound to the fullerene.

Modified fullerenes as ligands
Osmium tetraoxide adds to C60 to give, in the presence of pyridine (py), the diolate C60O2OsO2(py)2. 

The pentaphenyl anion C60Ph5− behaves as a cyclopentadienyl ligand.

<p style="text-align: left;">In this example, the binding of the ligand is similar to ferrocene. The anion C60(PhCH2)2Ph functions as an indenyl-like ligand.

Fullerenes can also be substituents on otherwise conventional ligands as seen with an isoxazoline fullerene chelating to platinum, rhenium, and iridium compounds.

Ongoing research
Although no application has been commercialized. non-linear optical (NLO) materials, and as supramolecular building blocks.

See also
Exohedral fullerene
Endohedral fullerene

References

Bibliography
Spessard, Gary; Miessler, Gary (2010). Organometallic Chemistry 

Fullerenes
Ligands